Ada Scott Brown (May 1, 1890 – March 30, 1950) was an American blues singer. She is best known for her recordings of "Ill Natural Blues", "Break o' Day Blues", and "Evil Mama Blues.

Biography
Brown was born and raised in Kansas City, Kansas. Her cousin James Scott was a ragtime composer and pianist.
Her early career was spent primarily on stage in musical theater and vaudeville. She recorded with Bennie Moten in 1926; the side "Evil Mama Blues" is possibly the earliest recording of Kansas City jazz. Aside from her time with Moten, she did several tours alongside bandleaders such as George E. Lee.

Brown was a founding member of the Negro Actors Guild of America in 1936. She worked at the London Palladium and on Broadway in the late 1930s. She sang "That Ain't Right" with Fats Waller in the musical film Stormy Weather (1943).

She also appeared in Harlem to Hollywood, accompanied by Harry Swannagan. Brown was featured on two tracks of the compilation album Ladies Sing the Blues ("Break o' Day Blues" and "Evil Mama Blues").

Brown died in Kansas City of kidney disease in March 1950.

References

External links
Eugene Chadbourne, Ada Brown at AllMusic

1890 births
1950 deaths
American blues singers
Singers from Kansas
Okeh Records artists
Deaths from kidney disease
20th-century American singers
20th-century American women singers